The Southern New England Telephone Company (commonly referred to as SNETCo by its customers), doing business as Frontier Communications of Connecticut, is a local exchange carrier owned by Frontier Communications.

History
It started operations on January 28, 1878 as the District Telephone Company of New Haven. It was the founder of the first telephone exchange, as well as the world's first telephone book. Since its inception, SNET has held a monopoly on most of the telephone services in the state of Connecticut; the only remaining exceptions are the Greenwich and Byram exchanges where Verizon New York provides telephone service.

SNET and Cincinnati Bell were the only two companies in the old Bell System in which the old AT&T only held a minority stake; by 1983, AT&T's stake was only 19.6 percent. Therefore, both were considered independents rather than Bell Operating Companies.

Sale to SBC
SNET was purchased for $4.4 billion in 1998 by SBC Communications, which subsequently purchased the old AT&T, taking its name as the "new" AT&T. Under AT&T, SNET was known as AT&T Connecticut.

In 2006, AT&T merged the operations of SNET into AT&T Teleholdings, formerly Ameritech, making it a subsidiary of the latter.

On June 1, 2007, the operations of Woodbury Telephone were merged into SNET.

Sale to Frontier
On October 24, 2014, Frontier Communications completed its purchase of AT&T's Connecticut operations, including Southern New England Telephone and SNET America, for $2 billion. The company began doing business as Frontier Communications of Connecticut. It is the second former unit of the Bell System to be acquired by Frontier, the first being Frontier West Virginia (originally C&P Telephone of West Virginia) which was purchased from Verizon in 2010.

See also
List of United States telephone companies
 ConnNet

External links
 History – University of Connecticut Libraries

References

Frontier Communications
Bell System
Telecommunications companies established in 1878
Telecommunications companies of the United States
Communications in Connecticut
Companies based in New Haven, Connecticut
1878 establishments in Connecticut